The Forecastle Festival is a three-day music, art, activism festival held annually in Louisville, Kentucky. The festival was founded in 2002 as a small gathering of local musicians in Tyler Park, and steadily grew into a national attraction that now includes major touring acts and an economic impact of over $20 million per year.  Forecastle was selected as one of Rolling Stone's "Coolest Festivals" and has an annual attendance of over 75,000 fans at Louisville Waterfront Park. It attracts attendees from nearly all 50 states, 2000 cities, and a dozen international countries. Past headliners include The Black Keys, Jack White, Beck, Sam Smith, Outkast, LCD Soundsystem, Arcade Fire, Chris Stapleton, My Morning Jacket, Sturgill Simpson, Alabama Shakes, The Flaming Lips, The Avett Brothers, Widespread Panic, Tame Impala, Jack Harlow, Tyler the Creator, and more 

The line-up for the 2019 (July 12–14) fest, the 17th, was announced and has The Killers; high-energy folk rockers, The Avett Brothers; and 2019 Grammy-winning hip-hop, funk and soul performers Anderson .Paak & The Free Nationals featured.

History

Derived from the nautical, maritime term forecastle, but pronounced as if it were the words "fore" and "castle" joined together, Forecastle began as a small, community event in 2002 by JK McKnight at Tyler Park. Structured as an equal representation of music, arts, and activism, the event grew quickly and audience expanded regionally. To accommodate increasing crowds, the festival moved to Cherokee Park in 2005, followed by The Mellwood Arts and Entertainment Center in 2006, Riverfront Plaza/Belvedere in 2007, and Louisville Waterfront Park in 2010. The festival's name, format, and concept were trademarked in 2007. Forecastle was named one of Outside Magazine's "Top 15 Festivals in the Country" in 2009.

AC Entertainment became a co-producer of Forecastle in 2011.

The festival was cancelled in 2020 and 2021 due to the COVID-19 pandemic. It is scheduled to return in 2022, with a move to late May on the Memorial Day weekend. In November 2022, organizers announced that the festival would not occur in 2023 to determine "the best path forward" for the event due to diminishing interest from significant shifts in music genres and formats over the years.

Music
Forecastle has showcased over 500 bands and a diverse number of musical genres, from rock to hip-hop, bluegrass to electronica. The event has multiple stages, all with maritime themes (Mast, Boom, Ocean, etc.). In addition to the headliners listed above, some previous musical guests include Cage the Elephant, Modest Mouse, Run the Jewels, Pretty Lights, Phantogram, Jim James, PJ Harvey, Band of Horses, Jason Isbell, Nathaniel Rateliff, Robert Plant, She & Him, Spoon, Vince Staples, A-Trak, Sleater-Kinney, Tortoise, Umphrey's McGee, The String Cheese Incident, The Black Crowes and Del the Funky Homosapien. The festival celebrated its 10th anniversary in 2012 with a collaboration with local musicians My Morning Jacket, who curated the event with festival organizers AC Entertainment and The Forecastle Festival. The lineup included such acts as Wilco, Girl Talk, Sleigh Bells, Beach House, Andrew Bird, Bassnectar, Neko Case, Houndmouth, Sleeper Agent (band),  and many more. In more recent years, the festival's lineup has shifted primarily toward alternative rap and EDM

Art
Forecastle has featured over 150 artists contributing a variety of installation work, as well as 2-D, 3-D, and mixed media. Each year's exhibition is commonly centered on a theme of ecology and sustainability. Until 2012, a panel of local and regional curators designed the exhibition from artist submissions received from universities and community institutions across the south and midwest. Since 2012, the artistic theme of the festival has shifted more to the nautical name and nature of the festival experience

Activism
In 2011, Forecastle founder  JK McKnight  created The Forecastle Foundation - a 501(c)(3) environmental non-profit dedicated to "protecting and connecting the world's natural awesome". The organization focuses on global hot spots: the most critically threatened, biologically diverse habitats left on earth. Hot spots cover just 2.3% of the Earth's land surface, yet account for 77% of all vertebrate species and 50% of the world's plant life. As of 2018, the Forecastle Foundation has contributed over $500,000 to its partners, including The Guayaki Foundation, The Nature Conservancy (US and Asia), FCD Belize, Kentucky Natural Lands Trust, and more. It e has showcased over 150 environmental non-profits and outdoor recreational organizations.  .

The Bourbon Lodge
In 2012, Forecastle Festival partnered with The Kentucky Distillers Association to launch The Bourbon Lodge: a 120' ft facility styled as a combination of a turn-of-the-century rickhouse and a prohibition-era speakeasy, where patrons can sample bourbon from distilleries in the state. The Lodge hosts events such as fireside chats with master distillers, mixology sessions, and culinary pairings. In 2013, bourbon writer Fred Minnick called Forecastle "the most important bourbon venue in the country to reach new consumers".  The Bourbon Lodge now partners with the Kentucky Bourbon Trail.

The Gonzo Bar
In honor of Louisville native and Kentucky Bourbon aficionado Hunter S. Thompson, Forecastle visual designers constructed a bourbon bar in the late writer's memory. It debuted on Hunter's posthumous 77th birthday, which was the same weekend as Forecastle 2014.

Lodging and Camping
The "Official Hotel & Headquarters" for the festival is the Galt House, which is Louisville's only riverfront hotel and features 1,300 rooms. Other nearby options include 21c Museum Hotel, Courtyard Marriott, and Ramada Downtown.
American Turners has been used as a campground the past three years. The riverfront property includes a bar, pool, showers, outdoor sports, and other amenities for campers. During the festival, a shuttle bus is usually provided to and from Forecastle Festival.

Halfway to Forecastle
"Halfway to Forecastle" is an annual mini-fest hosted each January to celebrate the "halfway" point to the festival. The event typically benefits a charity or non-profit, with recipients including Surfrider Foundation, Kentucky Waterways Alliance, and many more. Previous headliners include Pretty Lights, Big Boi, RJD2 and Kid Sister.

See also
List of attractions and events in the Louisville metropolitan area

References

External links
 

Folk festivals in the United States
Rock festivals in the United States
Festivals in Louisville, Kentucky
Environmental festivals
Festivals established in 2002
2002 establishments in Kentucky
July events
Music festivals in Kentucky